Tauba Auerbach (born 1981 in San Francisco, California) is a visual artist working in many disciplines including painting, artists' books, sculpture and weaving. They live and work in New York.

Early life and education
Auerbach grew up in San Francisco, California, the child of theater designers. They apprenticed and worked as a sign painter at New Bohemia Signs in San Francisco from 2002–2005.

Work
A life-long student of math and physics, Auerbach's work contends with structure and connectivity on the microscopic to the universal scale.  “Engaging a variety of media, ranging from painting and photography to book design and musical performance, Auerbach explores the limits of our structures and systems of logic (linguistic, mathematical, spatial) and the points at which they break down and open up onto new visual and poetic possibilities".

Notable work 
Text and Language based work

In their first solo exhibition, Auerbach showed a series of text-based drawings that explored various linguistic systems including calligraphy, Morse code, semaphore signals, the Ugaritic alphabet and Alexander Melville Bell's visible speech.

Fold paintings

Auerbach gained acclaim for their Fold paintings, which they first exhibited in 2009. They were included in the 2010 Whitney Biennial, and Greater New York at Moma PS1.

Weave paintings

The all white and sometimes bi-colored stretched weavings were first exhibited in Tetrachromat, and grew more intricate and architectural in the following years. They are composed of woven canvas strips.

Grain paintings

A series of mysterious gestural paintings created using custom tools made by the artist. “Some kind on controlled repetition. It is not irrational copying and pasting, but a way to see something slightly different for a reduced period of time. Scarcity then increases the value, directs our attention and creates characters” Luis Alberto Mejia Clavijo.

Glass sculpture

In 2015 Auerbach was a resident at Urban Glass in Brooklyn, NY. Here they learned the skills to craft the glass sculptures in the exhibition Projective Instrument.

Auerglass

The Auerglass Organ is a two-person tracker action pump organ conceived by Tauba Auerbach and Cameron Mesirow (Glasser) and constructed by Parson's Pipe Organs in Canandaigua, NY. Each player has a keyboard with alternating notes of a four octave scale. The instrument cannot be played alone because each player must pump to supply wind to the other player’s notes. Auerbach and Mesirow composed and performed a piece of music on the Auerglass in 2009. The instrument is now in residence at Future-Past studio in Hudson, New York.

Extended Object Paintings

Small, intimately scaled paintings made using an apparatus which allows the coordinated deposit of paint on the canvas in deliberate arrays of droplets.

Exhibitions

Solo exhibitions
2005: How to Spell the Alphabet, New Image Art Gallery, Los Angeles, California
2006: Yes and Not Yes, Deitch Projects, New York
2007: The Answer/Wasn't Here, Jack Hanley Gallery, San Francisco, California
2009: Here and Now/And Nowhere, Deitch Projects, New York
2010: The W Axis, Standard (Oslo), Oslo, Norway
2011: Tetrachromat, Bergen Kunsthall, Bergen, Norway; Malmo Konsthall, Malmo, Sweden; Wiels Contemporary Art Center, Brussels, Belgium
2013: Night (1947-2015), The Phillip Johnson Glass House, New Canaan, Connecticut
2013: A comb, A grating, A wave, A particle, A solid, A field, A mirror, A sundial, A slice, A charge, A hole, A ghost, Standard (Oslo), Oslo, Norway
2014: The New Ambidextrous Universe, Institute of Contemporary Arts, London
2015: (Two person) Reciprocal Score / Tauba Auerbach and Charlotte Posenenske, Indipendenza Roma, Rome, Italy
2016: Projective Instrument, Paula Cooper Gallery, New York
2016/2017: Safety Curtain, Vienna State Opera, an exhibition project by museum in progress, Vienna, Austria
2018: INDUCTION: Tauba Auerbach and Eliane Radigue, MOCA Cleveland, Cleveland, OH
2018-2019 Flow Separation: John J. Harvey Fireboat, commissioned by Public Art Fund and 14-18 NOW, New York Harbor, New York
2018: A Broken Stream, Paula Cooper Gallery, New York
2019: Current, Artist’s Institute, New York, NY
2020: Panthalassa, Standard (Oslo), Oslo, Norway

Group exhibitions
2009: The Generational: Younger than Jesus, The New Museum, New York
2010: 2010 Whitney Biennial, Whitney Museum of American Art, New York
2010: Greater New York, MoMA PS1, Long Island City, New York
2011: The Indiscipline of Painting Tate St. Ives, Cornwall, touring to Warwick Art Centre (2011/12)
2012: Lifelike, Walker Art Center, Minneapolis, Minnesota
2012: Remote Control, Institute of Contemporary Arts, London
2012: Ecstatic Alphabets/Heaps of Language, MoMA, New York
2013: DECORUM: Carpets and tapestries by artists, Musee D'Art Moderne, Paris
2015: TeleGenic - Art and Television, Kunstmuseum Bonn, Bonn, Germany
2015: Condensed Matter Community, Synchrotron Radiation Center: Home of Aladdin, Stoughton, Wisconsin
2016: Typeface to Interface: Graphic Design from the Collection, SFMoMA, San Francisco, California

Books

Diagonal Press 
In 2013 Auerbach founded Diagonal Press, under which they publish books, type specimens, manipulatives and other items. All publications are open editions; nothing is signed or numbered.
 A Partial Taxonomy of Periodic Linear Ornament. Tauba Auerbach. New York: Diagonal Press (2017).
 There Have Been and Will Be Many San Franciscos. Tauba Auerbach. New York: Diagonal Press (2016).
 Projective Ornament. Claude Bragdon. New York: Diagonal Press (2016).
 A Primer of Higher Space. Claude Bragdon. New York: Diagonal Press (2016).
 The Gold Church. Tauba Auerbach. New York: Diagonal Press (2014).
 Reciprocal Score. Tauba Auerbach. New York: Diagonal Press (2015).
 Z Helix. Tauba Auerbach. New York: Diagonal Press (2015).
 Maille. Tauba Auerbach. New York: Diagonal Press (2014).
 Saccade 1. Tauba Auerbach. New York: Diagonal Press (2013).
 Saccade 2. Tauba Auerbach. New York: Diagonal Press (2013).
 Saccade 3. Tauba Auerbach. New York: Diagonal Press (2013).

Artists' books: editions 

 [2,3]. New York: Printed Matter, 2010. Edition of 1,000., 85 Artist's Proofs, 3 Printer's Proofs, 12 Hors Commerce.
 STAB/GHOST. Paris: Three Star Books, 2013. Edition of 10, 3 Artist's Proofs, 3 Hors Commerce.
 RGB Colorspace Atlas, New York: 2011. Three volumes. Edition of 3, 2 Artist's Proofs, 2 Exhibition Copies, 1 Binder's Copy.
 Bent Onyx, New York: 2012. Edition of 3, 2 Artist's Proofs.
 Marble, New York: 2011. Edition of 10, 2 Artist's Proofs, 2 Exhibition Copies.
 Wood, New York: 2011. Edition of 10, 2 Artist's Proofs, 2 Exhibition Copies.
 Float, New York: 2011. Edition of 8, 2 Artist's Proofs, 2 Exhibition Copies.

Monographs
 How To Spell The Alphabet. New York: Deitch Projects (2007). 
 50/50: Tauba Auerbach. New York: Deitch Projects (2008). 
 Chaos: Tauba Auerbach. New York: Deitch Projects (2009). 
 Folds: Tauba Auerbach. Berlin: Sternberg Press (2012). 
S v Z: Tauba Auerbach. SFMoMA/D.A.P. 2020

See also 

 Flow Separation (2018)

References

External links 
 Artist's Website
 Diagonal Press
 Paula Cooper Gallery
 Standard (Oslo)
 Tauba Auerbach Exhibition and Auction History

American women artists
1981 births
Living people
Stanford University School of Humanities and Sciences alumni
21st-century American women